Robin E. Wray (born 23 October 1943) was a football Youth Coach at Huddersfield Town, Sheffield Wednesday and Leeds United.

Coaching career
Robin Wray joined Huddersfield Town as part-time coach to the juniors in 1967 after gaining numerous honours, both in academic studies and physical education and while teaching PE and History at Huddersfield New College. He eventually turned full-time in 1969. Wray, who played water-polo in the Netherlands, France and Belgium for English Universities whilst at college, had a long successful period with the juniors at Huddersfield from 1967 until the late 80's and then again in 1998 up until the early 2002 before retiring and being replaced by John Dungworth.

Huddersfield Town
Wray started at Huddersfield Town as a part-time youth coach, while he was a PE and History teacher at Huddersfield New College. In 1969, Huddersfield's Manager Ian Greaves made Wray full-time  and was part of Greaves's backroom staff. Wray's largest success at Huddersfield Town was probably getting to the final of the FA Youth Cup in 1974, with players such as Dick Taylor, Peter Hart and Lloyd Maitland playing for his youth team. However, Town lost to Spurs in the final, but got to play the England Youth team in a friendly at Leeds Road where Dick Taylor played for England. Wray left Town in the late 1980s to join Sheffield Wednesday's youth team setup.

Sheffield Wednesday
Wray took Wednesday's youth team to the FA Youth Cup Final in 1991 but lost. Wray left in 1994 for Leeds United's Academy.

Leeds United
Wray won two FA Youth Cups during his four-year spell at Leeds and returned to Huddersfield Town in 1998, his coaching career had come full circle.

Huddersfield Town
Wray rejoined Huddersfield Town's Academy under Gerry Murphy in 1998 and worked as a Youth Coach, he coached players such as Jon Stead, Jon Worthington, Andy Holdsworth, Alex Smithies and Shane Killock until he finally retired in summer 2002 after 35 years of youth coaching.

Personal life
Robin Wray still coaches locally around West Yorkshire and as of 2010 he still lives in Holmfirth.

References

Huddersfield Town A.F.C. non-playing staff
Living people
1943 births